Bestuzhev or Bestuzheva (feminine) may refer to:

Bestuzhev (surname), a Russian surname, including a list of people with the name
Bestuzhev (cattle), a cattle breed from Russia
Bestuzhev Courses, a women's higher education institution in Imperial Russia.